Khmelevskaya is a rural locality (a village) in Mityukovskoye Rural Settlement, Vozhegodsky District, Vologda Oblast, Russia. The population was 26 as of 2002.

Geography 
Khmelevskaya is located 66 km east of Vozhega (the district's administrative centre) by road. Kostyuninskaya is the nearest rural locality.

References 

Rural localities in Vozhegodsky District